Mount Kahuzi is an extinct volcano in the Democratic Republic of the Congo.
It is within the Kahuzi-Biéga National Park, a World Heritage Site.

Location

Mount Kahuzi was last active at the end of the Pleistocene.
At  it is the highest peak in the Mitumba Range, which runs along the west shore of Lake Kivu in the Albertine Rift.
The eastern part of the Biega - Kahuzi National Park, a World Heritage Site, lies on the slopes of the mountain.
The Zoological and Forest Reserve of Mount Kahuzi was created by decree on 27 July 1937, and extended in 1951 to include the Biega forest. It was gazetted as a national park in 1970.

Flora

Vegetation includes wet lowland rain forest, transitional rainforest and Afromontaine vegetation that is dominated by tree heathers.
Hedythrsus thamnoideus and Disa erubescens grow on one summit of Mount Kahuzi.

Fauna

Gorillas are found in the region, including the mountain slopes.
In 1993 the population around Mount Kahuzi was estimated to be about 275 individuals.
Their population was devastated during the Second Congo War of the late 1990s.

The extremely rare Mount Kahuzi climbing mouse has been found on its slopes.

References

South Kivu
Kahuzi
Great Rift Valley
Kahuzi
Kahuzi
Kahuzi